Keith Victor Holman, MBE (11 September 1927 – 11 October 2011) was an Australian Rugby League footballer, a national and state representative  whose club career was played with Western Suburbs from 1949 to 1961.

He has since been named as one of the nation's finest footballers of the 20th century. After retiring as player, Holman was coach of Wests and later became one of the game's top-level referees. He was appointed a Member of the Order of the British Empire (MBE) in 1977.

Background
Holman was born in Ballarat, Australia.

Early years and war service
Holman had an impoverished childhood during the Great Depression. In his earliest years he was raised in a shanty at Yarra Bay in Sydney by a man named Holman who may have been his father. He was taken in by a local family named Schofield who enabled him to be schooled by the De La Salle Brothers at Surry Hills. There he met and befriended Bernie Purcell whom he would later play against and alongside in state and Kangaroo touring sides.

Toward the end of the Second World War Holman joined the RAAF as a Leading Aircraftman. He was a chef with 82 Wing, 23 Squadron and was posted to bases in Ipswich, Queensland and later after the Japanese surrender, at Morakai and Balikpapan in Borneo. The Squadron flew B-24 Liberators in a transport role, flying ex-Prisoners of War and other Australian personnel back to Australia.

Club career
After the war he trialled for a contract with South Sydney but was turned away due to his small stature. An approach to Manly was also unsuccessful so he headed to Dubbo and befriended former Wests  Eric Bennett. With Bennett's help, he landed a contract with the Magpies in 1948 and quickly rose through the ranks, playing with the Magpies until 1961.

In thirteen seasons at Wests he never played in a premiership-winning team at club level. He missed Wests' premiership victory in 1952 because he was selected for that year's Kangaroo tour. He was captain-coach at Wests for seasons 1954 and 1955.

Representative career
Holman started his representative career with selection for New South Wales in 1950 and continued to represent the Blues until 1958.

Also in 1950, Holman made his test debut for Australia, figuring prominently in Australia's first Ashes conquest in 30 years. He was selected to represent Sydney against France during their 1951 tour of Australasia in a match that ended in a 19-all draw. He made both the 1952 Kangaroo tour (5 Tests and 5 tour matches) and the 1956–57 tour (all 6 Tests plus 11 tour matches). Holman was the Australian selectors preferred halfback choice and regular in Test sides and World Cup squads from 1950 to 1958. By the end of his representative career he had amassed the then record of 32 Tests and a then record of 14 Anglo-Australian international appearances, beating Clive Churchill and Sandy Pearce. He made 12 Test appearances against France and 6 appearances against New Zealand. He was named New South Wales Player of the Year three times – 1951, 1956 and 1958.

Referee & coach
When his playing days were over he turned to refereeing. In a 1971 game between Queensland and New South Wales, Holman sent off three players. Holman controlled the 1971 Grand Final and went on to referee the Tests of New Zealand's tour of Australia in 1972. He was consistent first grade referee in 155 games from 1965 till 1974.

He coached a Port Kembla side in 1975 and 1976 and then Western Suburbs in the NSWRFL. His final year active year in rugby league was 1977 when he coached his beloved Wests to victory in the 1977 Amco Cup.

Accolades
He had the rare honour of being made a life member of Western Suburbs while still playing.

Keith Holman was awarded Life Membership of the New South Wales Rugby League in 1983.

He was later selected in the Wests Tigers Team of the Century and the Western Suburbs Magpies Team of the Century. In 2003 he was admitted into the Australian Rugby League Hall of Fame.

In 2007 Holman was selected by a panel of experts at halfback in an Australian 'Team of the 50s'.

In February 2008, Holman was named in the list of Australia's 100 Greatest Players (1908–2007) which was commissioned by the NRL and ARL to
celebrate the code's centenary year in Australia. Also in 2008 the Western Suburbs Magpies celebrated their centenary by inducting six inaugural members into the club's Hall of Fame. These six included Holman.

Footnotes

References
 Whiticker, Alan & Collis, Ian (2006) The History of Rugby League Clubs, New Holland, Sydney
 Whiticker, Alan & Hudson, Glen (2006) The Encyclopedia of Rugby League Players, Gavin Allen Publishing, Sydney
 Andrews, Malcolm (2006) The ABC of Rugby League Austn Broadcasting Corpn, Sydney
 Haddan, Steve (2007) The Finals – 100 Years of National Rugby League Finals, Steve Haddan Publishing, Brisbane
 Heads, Ian and Middleton, David (2008) A Centenary of Rugby League, MacMillan Sydney

External links
  (archive)
 Keith Holman at eraofthebiff.com
 1980 Holman Interview at eraofthebiff.com
 Keith Holman at yesterdayshero.com.au

1927 births
2011 deaths
Australia national rugby league team players
Australian rugby league coaches
Australian rugby league players
Australian rugby league referees
City New South Wales rugby league team players
Australian Members of the Order of the British Empire
New South Wales rugby league team players
Royal Australian Air Force airmen
Royal Australian Air Force personnel of World War II
Rugby league halfbacks
Rugby league players from Sydney
Sport Australia Hall of Fame inductees
Western Suburbs Magpies coaches
Western Suburbs Magpies players